The Mapi River or Mappi River (Indonesian: Sungai Mapi) is a river in southern Papua province, Indonesia.

Geography
The river flows in the southern area of Papua with predominantly tropical rainforest climate (designated as Af in the Köppen-Geiger climate classification). The annual average temperature in the area is 22 °C. The warmest month is February, when the average temperature is around 24 °C, and the coldest is June, at 20 °C. The average annual rainfall is 3143-3577 mm. The wettest month is February, with an average of 403 mm rainfall, and the driest is July, with 66 mm rainfall.

See also
List of rivers of Indonesia
List of rivers of Western New Guinea
Mappi River Awyu language

References

Rivers of South Papua
Rivers of Indonesia